Lindsay Middlebrook (born September 7, 1955) is a Canadian former professional ice hockey goaltender. He played in the National Hockey League (NHL) with the Winnipeg Jets, Minnesota North Stars, New Jersey Devils and Edmonton Oilers between 1979 and 1983. As a youth, he played in the 1968 Quebec International Pee-Wee Hockey Tournament with a minor ice hockey team from Toronto.

Career statistics

Regular season and playoffs

Awards and honours

References

External links

1955 births
Living people
Canadian ice hockey goaltenders
Edmonton Oilers players
Ice hockey people from Simcoe County
Milwaukee Admirals (IHL) players
Minnesota North Stars players
Moncton Alpines (AHL) players
Montana Magic players
Nashville South Stars players
New Haven Nighthawks players
New Jersey Devils players
Sportspeople from Collingwood, Ontario
Saint Louis Billikens men's ice hockey players
Toledo Goaldiggers players
Tulsa Oilers (1964–1984) players
Undrafted National Hockey League players
Wichita Wind players
Winnipeg Jets (1979–1996) players
Canadian expatriate ice hockey players in the United States